Tanayka (Tänäy) is a rural locality (a village) in Bedeyevo-Polyansky Selsoviet, Blagoveshchensky District, Bashkortostan, Russia. The population was 60 as of 2010. There are 2 streets.

Geography 
Pavlovka is the nearest rural locality.

References 

Rural localities in Blagoveshchensky District